The following is a list of governors and chief administrators of the states  and administrative areas of South Sudan.

10 states and three areas (2020-present)

Governors of states

Chief Administrators of administrative areas

32 States (2017-2020)

See also
Subdivisions of South Sudan
List of Sudan's state governors
List of Centrafrican prefectures prefects

References

External links
South Sudanese governors on Worldsatesmen

South Sudanese state governors